A wastebasket diagnosis or trashcan diagnosis is a vague diagnosis given to a patient or to medical records department for essentially non-medical reasons. It may be given when the patient has an obvious but unidentifiable medical problem, when a doctor wants to reassure an anxious patient about the doctor's belief in the existence of reported symptoms, when a patient pressures a doctor for a label, or when a doctor wants to facilitate bureaucratic approval of treatment.

The term may also be used pejoratively to describe disputed medical conditions. In this sense, the term implies that the condition has not been properly classified. It can carry a connotation that the prognosis of individuals with the condition are more heterogeneous than would be associated with a more precisely defined clinical entry. As diagnostic tools improve, it is possible for these kinds of wastebasket diagnoses to be properly defined and reclassified as clinical diagnoses. 
Wastebasket diagnoses are often made by medical specialists, and referred back to primary care physicians for long term management. 

Specific diagnoses

Common wastebasket diagnoses include:
 Chronic fatigue syndrome (when applied to undiagnosed fatigue)
 Fibromyalgia (when applied to undiagnosed pain)
 Subclinical hypothyroidism
 Seronegative rheumatoid arthritis
 Irritable bowel syndrome
 Chronic pain syndromes
 Interstitial cystitis ("bladder pain syndrome")
 Costochondritis (when applied to undiagnosed chest pain)
 Gastroesophageal reflux (when applied to undiagnosed chest pain) 

Reactive hypoglycemia has been used as a trashcan diagnosis for people who complain about normal physiological reactions to being hungry. In these cases, the labels are offered when nothing more serious can be identified. Bronchitis may be used as a trashcan diagnosis to label sick children.

History
Fake diagnoses are not a modern invention. Medicine around the world has a long history of using and abusing the concept of trashcan diagnoses, from "rectifying the humors" to marthambles to neurasthenia to garbled Latin-sounding names which were made up to impress the patient's family.

Management 
The medical community is often split on the best approach to managing a wastebasket diagnosis. The biggest challenge for a physician is maintaining their interest and desire to see the patient through their illness. Antidepressants and cognitive therapies are commonly employed, speaking to the possible emotional basis that underpins these diagnoses or the physician's effort to psychopathologize the patient whose disorder the physician can not identify.

See also
 Diagnosis of exclusion, the diagnosis given to a patient when all other plausible options have been ruled out
 Bright's disease

References

Psychiatric diagnosis
Psychiatric false diagnosis